Eternal Soldier is a role-playing game published by Tai-Gear Simulations in 1986.

Description
Eternal Soldier is a universal system, focusing mainly on providing combat rules usable in any genre or time period. Eternal Soldier is a skill-based system; the rules cover character attributes, over 100 skills, combat, weapons, and many standard professions. The game includes appendices for science-fiction, fantasy, superheroes, magic, and psionics rules.

Publication history
Eternal Soldier was designed by Chris Arnold, Rob Arnold, and Joe Mays, and published by Tai-Gear Simulations in 1986 as a 164-page book with two cardstock sheets.

Reception
Rick Swan reviewed Eternal Soldier in Space Gamer/Fantasy Gamer No. 85. Swan commented that "I guess you know when you've got something good when the clones start crawling out of the woodwork. The latest serving of sincere flattery for Steve Jackson's GURPS is Eternal Soldier, a role-playing system for 'Adventures in Any Age' that is, sad to report, not even a nice try." (Note: Development of Eternal Soldier began in 1981 - 5 years before the release of GURPS - both first appeared at Gen Con in 1986)

Reviews
White Wolf #9 (1988)

References

Role-playing games introduced in 1986
Universal role-playing games